Guilherme Preto Beléa Molinaris Cardoso (born 13 July 2001), commonly known as Guilherme Beléa, is a Brazilian professional footballer who plays as a left-winger and right-winger for Brasil de Pelotas.

Club career

Grêmio
Born in Sapucaia do Sul, Brazil, Guilherme Beléa joined the Grêmio's Academy at the age of 17 in 2019.

Career statistics

Club

References

External links

Profile at the Grêmio F.B.P.A. website

2001 births
Sportspeople from Rio Grande do Sul
Living people
Brazilian footballers
Association football forwards
Grêmio Foot-Ball Porto Alegrense players
Clube Esportivo Aimoré players
Ypiranga Futebol Clube players
S.C. Covilhã players
Grêmio Esportivo Brasil players
Campeonato Brasileiro Série C players
Liga Portugal 2 players
Brazilian expatriate footballers
Expatriate footballers in Portugal
Brazilian expatriate sportspeople in Portugal